George Franklin Giles (May 2, 1909 – March 3, 1992) was a Negro leagues first baseman and manager. He started with Gilkerson's Union Giants at the age of 17, and signed with the Kansas City Monarchs at the age of 18. The last known team he played for was the Satchel Paige All Stars of 1939.

Giles' grandson, Brian Giles, was a second baseman for the New York Mets of the National League in the early 1980s.

References

External links
 and Baseball-Reference Black Baseball stats and Seamheads
  and Seamheads

1909 births
1992 deaths
Baseball players from Kansas
Baltimore Black Sox players
Brooklyn Eagles players
Homestead Grays players
Kansas City Monarchs players
New York Black Yankees players
Philadelphia Stars players
Pittsburgh Crawfords players
St. Louis Stars (baseball) players
People from Junction City, Kansas
Negro league baseball managers
20th-century African-American sportspeople